Bass Branch is a stream in Crawford County in the U.S. state of Missouri. It is a tributary of Doss Branch which enters Courtois Creek approximately 1000 feet to the west.

Bass Branch most likely has the name of Roland Bass, an early settler.

See also
List of rivers of Missouri

References

Rivers of Crawford County, Missouri
Rivers of Missouri